Alampallam is a village in the Pattukkottai taluk of Thanjavur district, Tamil Nadu, India.

Demographics 

As per the 2001 census, Alanpallam had a total population of 1184 with 537 males and 647 females. The sex ratio was 1205. The literacy rate was 67.77.

References 

 

Villages in Thanjavur district